Stefan Vico (born 28 February 1995) is a Montenegrin footballer who plays for Serbian club Javor Ivanjica.

Club career
Vico was playing in the youth teams of FK Rad until the season 2012–13 when he debuted for the first team in the Serbian SuperLiga.

Born in Herceg Novi, Montenegro, Vico played for the Montenegrin U-16 in 2010, however, after debuting for the first team of Rad, he was included in the Serbian U-18 and U-19 teams in 2013.  The lack of calls for the Serbian youth national teams since then made Vico switch once more and accept a call for the Montenegrin U-21 team in March 2016.

On 3 April 2019, Vico joined Næstved BK in the Danish 1st Division. He left the club in summer 2020 after they were relegated to the Danish 2nd Division.

On 26 December 2020, he signed a three-year contract with Serbian club Javor Ivanjica.

International career
In May 2016 he was part of Montenegro "B" team.

Career statistics

References

External links
 Profile - Naestved
 
 
 
 Stats at Utakmica.rs

1995 births
Living people
People from Kotor
Serbian people of Montenegrin descent
Association football fullbacks
Serbian footballers
Serbia youth international footballers
Montenegrin footballers
Montenegro youth international footballers
Montenegro under-21 international footballers
Footballers at the 2010 Summer Youth Olympics
FK Rad players
OFK Žarkovo players
FK Inđija players
Næstved Boldklub players
FK Javor Ivanjica players
Serbian First League players
Serbian SuperLiga players
Danish 1st Division players
Montenegrin expatriate footballers
Expatriate men's footballers in Denmark
Montenegrin expatriate sportspeople in Denmark